The R701 is a Regional Route in South Africa.

Route
Its western terminus is the N1 near Gariep Dam. From here, it runs east, along the northern shore of the Gariep Dam. The first town it passes through is Bethulie, where it crosses the R715 and then meets the northern terminus of the R390. From Bethulie, it heads east-north-east, and the next town it comes to is Smithfield. At Smithfield, it is briefly cosigned with the intersecting N6 heading north, before emerging to head north-east out of the town. The route ends at an intersection with the R26 and R717 near Wepener.

References 

Regional Routes in the Free State (province)